The Upper Volga (Verkhne-Volzhskaya) railway (Russian: Верхне-Волжская железная дорога) was a private railway in the upper Volga region of Russia, built in 1914–1918 and in the second half of the 1930s. It was planned as part of a backup route from St. Petersburg to Moscow. Today, the lines are part of the Moscow region of the October Railway.

Main lines 

 Savelovo-Kalyazin (completed 1918)
 Kashin-Kalyazin (completed 1918)
 Kalyazin - Uglich (completed 1930s)
 Kalyazin - Novki – Not constructed

Historical background 
The Verkhne-Volzhskaya railroad was designed and built at the beginning of the 20th century on the promising from the transport and economic point of view Tver-Rybinsk-Nizhny Novgorod, which was barely covered by the fast railway transport at the time. The Verkhne-Volzhskaya railway was to connect the cities of Kashin, Kalyazin, Rybinsk, and Uglich both with each other and with the Moscow-Savyolovo branch completed in 1900, which made it possible to speed up the delivery of goods to Moscow from the Volga, the carriage of goods at that time was carried out on slow-moving punts.

The construction of the Verkhne-Volzhskaya railway, the main branches of which were located and projected to the north-northwest of Moscow, in the Tver, Yaroslavl, and Vladimir regions, as well as the work of the joint stock company to create it. This is a pre-revolutionary concept that is analogous to what is today called as private-state partnership.

Such concessionary or mixed public-private form of financing and management was typical for the construction of railways in Russia. Against the background of the boom in the middle of the 19th century of the construction of railways, the Russian state combined a private way of building roads and building them at the expense of the treasury, periodically switching priority to a particular construction system.

From the second half of the 19th century and before the revolution of 1917, several main branches of railways were laid and operated with the money of private founders with the participation of the state, which formed the basis of the modern railway network of Russia.

The Sino-Eastern Railway (KVZhD), Kulundinskaya, and the Minusinsk Railway, the Akkerman Railway, the Southeast Railway network, the Olonets Railway—all these roads were built with the involvement of the capitals of private entrepreneurs-concessionaires, united in the form of joint-stock companies. (The very concept of a joint-stock company in pre-revolutionary Russia was enshrined in the "Regulations on Companies on Shares", approved by the Decree of December 6, 1836, and in force until the October Revolution).

The founders of railway societies were given permission and administrative support of the state, but they had colossal financial risks. To obtain permission to establish a joint-stock company, they required the consent of the supreme authority or bodies of subordinate management, as well as the Minister of Finance.

Projects were very risky for entrepreneurs: before they were allowed to establish a company, they were obliged to conduct a survey of the route; draw up a complete road design; to work out estimates for all construction projects; and also to contribute to the State Bank 5% of the total amount of construction capital. At the same time, the Government could reject the project or even completely abandon the concession.

Despite the risks, the operation of railways was economically attractive. The government guaranteed fulfillment of obligations on securities of railway companies. Owners of shares were provided with a solid dividend not from the moment of putting the line into operation, but from the day of the organization of the joint-stock company.

Founders of the Company and its charter 

The founders of the Verkhne-Volzhskaya Railroad Society were the entrepreneur & railway pioneer Nikolai Vasilievich Belyaev (1859-1920), the honorary citizen of Pereslavl Zalessky Leonid Pavlov (1870-1917), the railway engineer Fedor Nikolayevich Mamontov, the nobleman Nikolai Mitrofanovich Andreev, the personal honorary citizen Ivan Orestovich Kurlyukov and the major-general Anatoly Anatolyevich Reinboth (1868-1918). The Chairman of the board was Nikolai Vasilievich Belyaev.

The Board of the company was located in Moscow, and the management of the construction of railway lines in St. Petersburg in the House of Pertsov (N.N. Pertsov was one of the founders of the Black Sea Railroad Society).

The most significant right that the shareholders of the company received was the right to own the highway and its subsidiary enterprises for 81 years from the day the movement was opened.

At the same time, the Society assumed many obligations to the state. So, after the expiry of the 81-year-term, the railway and other property of the Society should go free of charge to the treasury. The property of the company, both immovable and movable, constituting the railroad's ownership, could not be alienated or mortgaged without the permission of the government.

Among other duties of the company were the survey of the construction of the Uglich-Rybinsk line, the provision of mail and, if necessary, troops, the removal of apartments for postal and telegraph officials, the construction of a military food station on the Kashin-Novki line.

The carrying capacity of the railway was to be 3 pairs of passenger and 6 pairs of freight trains per day. It was also planned to use the road for the movement of military trains.

The road was planned to be built in 3 years. The total cost of the project, including the rolling stock, as well as the working capital of the company, was to be 21 million 620 thousand rubles.

Planning and construction of railway lines before the Revolution 

The Verkhne-Volzhskaya railway was built in order to connect the cities of Kashin (at that time the station of the Moscow-Vindavo-Rybinsk railway), Kalyazin and Novki station of the Moscow-Nizhny Novgorod railway.

Also, two more branches were to be built from Kalyazin. The first - to the station Savelovo (then - run by the Northern Railways), and the second - to the city of Uglich.

According to data for 1914, the total length of the road was 332 versts (354 km). Of these, the Kashin-Novka line was to be the longest - about 239 versts, the Kalyazin-Savelovo branch 50 versts (53 km), and the Kalyazin-Uglich branch about 43 versts (46 km).

Because of the First World War and the revolution in Russia, construction was very slow. During the years 1914–1917, the company built the Kalyazin-Savelovo railway line, which was opened in 1918.

The second "short" branch of Kashin-Kalyazin was also built. The opening of this section closed the reserve route from Moscow to St. Petersburg, passing through Kalyazin, Ovinische, Khvoynaya, Mga.

In 1916, the price lists for the construction of the Kashin-Novki and Savelovo-Uglich lines were developed. However, in connection with the same difficult financial situation in the country, the construction of the Savyolovsky radius from Kalyazin through Uglich to Rybinsk (designed in pre-revolution Russia) never began.

Verkhne-Volzhskaya railway in the Soviet era 
After 1918, several members of the Society of the Upper Volga Railway, including entrepreneur and railway pioneer N.V. Belyaev suffered repressions, and the Upper Volga Railroad Society, as well as the lines of the railway built up – were nationalized and handed over to the People's Commissariat of Railways.

The "tsarist" plans for the construction of the Kalyazin-Uglich-Rybinsk line were recalled in the 1930s during industrialization when it became necessary to deliver construction materials for the construction of the Uglich hydroplant. In a short time, the Kalyazin-Uglich branch (48 km), opened for traffic in 1937, was finally completed based on the project plans of the Upper Volga Railroad Society.

With the flooding of the bed of the Uglich reservoir in some areas, it was necessary to move the roads, and some of the settlements were flooded, including the historic town of Kalyazin. The same happened with the settlements on the section between the cities of Uglich and Rybinsk in connection with the organization of the Rybinsk Reservoir.

Upper-Volga railroad today 
Today, the Savelovo-Kalyazin and Kalyazin-Uglich branches are part of the Savelovsky direction of the Moscow region of October Railway. They serve goods trains and the passenger train Moscow-Rybinsk.

References

Literature
 The Upper Volga Railway project: Explanatory a note to the project. - St. Petersburg, 1913. http://rr.aroundspb.ru/1913_Kashin_Novki_Savelovo_Uglija_zd-1.pdf
 Technical conditions for design and construction of the Upper Volga railway. - Moscow, 1914. http://rr.aroundspb.ru/1913_Kashin_Novki_Savelovo_Uglija_zd-2.pdf
 Essay on the petition of Kalyazin's public figures on the conduct of a railway through Kalyazin Tver province. Kalyazin, 1915.

Archives 
Moscow Central State Archive. MF 1434. Op.1. The board of society of the Verkhne-Volzhskaya (Upper Volga) railway. 1914–1917. Dd.1-10.
State Archive of St. Petersburg. F.-9346. Op.1. Department of Construction of the Upper Volga Railway - Committee of Public Institutions of the Supreme Economic Council of the RSFSR (1917 - [1921]). Dd. 158. 1917-1921 yy.
RGIA. F.350. Plans and drawings for the construction of railways (collection). Op.77. Verkhne-Volzhskaya (Upper Volga) railway, etc. 1873-1917 yy.

External links 

Korshunov A. The Kalyazin zemstvo got the railway
McKay J.P. Pioneers for Profit: Foreign Entrepreneurship and Russian Industrialization, 1885-1913. p. 171

Railway companies of Russia
Railway lines in Russia